Viorel Talapan (born 25 February 1972, Mihai Viteazu) is a retired Romanian rower. He competed in coxed fours and eights at the 1992, 1996 and 2000 Olympics and won a gold and a silver medal in 1992. At the world championships he won seven medals between 1993 and 1998, including three gold medals.

References

1972 births
Living people
Romanian male rowers
Rowers at the 1992 Summer Olympics
Rowers at the 1996 Summer Olympics
Rowers at the 2000 Summer Olympics
Olympic rowers of Romania
Olympic gold medalists for Romania
Olympic silver medalists for Romania
Olympic medalists in rowing
Medalists at the 1992 Summer Olympics
World Rowing Championships medalists for Romania